Gilcomston Church is an independent evangelical congregation, which meets in the church buildings on Union Street, Aberdeen.  The congregation was formerly part of the Church of Scotland and known as Gilcomston South Church.

Overview 
The church almost closed during World War II, but a subsequent new approach proved controversial but ultimately highly influential. The church became one of the Church of Scotland's most notable evangelical congregations, with a strong emphasis on biblically based expository preaching.  The Rev William Still, minister of the congregation 1945–97, developed this approach and gained international recognition. The systematic preaching of the entire bible, verse-by-verse and chapter-by-chapter, was then an innovation in the Church of Scotland; some others have subsequently copied this approach. The Rev William Still was close friends with the brothers Rev James Philip of Holyrood Abbey Church in Edinburgh and Rev George Philip of Sandyford Henderson Memorial Church in Glasgow, where similar approaches in ministry were also developed. William Still never married.

This Aberdeen church is well attended, especially by students responding to this distinctive type of Christian ministry and witness. From 1998 to 2015, the minister was the Rev Dominic Smart. In June 2011, Rev Dominic Smart indicated that the congregation were considering leaving the Church of Scotland due to the General Assembly's decision to move towards the ordination of homosexuals to the ministry.  In February 2013 the Rev Dominic Smart announced on the church website that he was leaving the Church of Scotland.  The Elders and almost the entire membership also left the Church of Scotland, and formed an independent congregation with the Minister. The congregation initially rented the church building from the Church of Scotland before purchasing it outright.
As of Autumn 2016 the minister is Rev. Jeremy R H Middleton, who had been minister at Davidson's Mains Church of Scotland from 1988 until 2015.

Gallery

See also 
 List of Church of Scotland parishes

References

External links 
 Gilcomston Church

Church of Scotland churches in Scotland
Churches in Aberdeen
Category B listed buildings in Aberdeen
Listed churches in Scotland